The Wild Man of Borneo is a 1941 American comedy film directed by Robert B. Sinclair and written by Waldo Salt and John McClain, based on the 1927 Broadway play by Marc Connelly and Herman J. Mankiewicz. The film stars Frank Morgan and features Mary Howard, Billie Burke, Donald Meek, Marjorie Main, Connie Gilchrist, Bonita Granville and Dan Dailey. The film was released on January 24, 1941 by Metro-Goldwyn-Mayer.

Plot
“The good old days! When Roosevelt was president, and Dewey was an admiral. …. The medicine, man! A grifter, a grafter, a fraud, and a liar – he’s sold you a bottle to make you well he took your money and made you like it…”

Dissolve to a medicine show wagon proclaiming, “Dr. Dunbar’s Traveling Temple of Health.” 

Dan Thompson emerges carrying two suitcases, and enters another wagon, where his partner, Doc Selby, is filling bottles of snake tonic. Dan’s 18-year-old daughter has asked him to come, now that her wealthy aunt has died. He last saw Mary when she was three. Weary of grifting and eager to “make good” with Mary, he is taking the next train to Twin Rapids, New York. Arriving at a huge Victorian mansion, he discovers that the house has been emptied by creditors. He cannot bear to tell Mary that his letters were full of lies. He takes her to a theatrical boarding house New York City full of characters. The landlady, Bernice Marshall, is a widow. She and her husband ran a successful repertory company. Daniel cons his way into her good graces by pretending to be a friend of Richard Mansfield, an actor Bernice idealizes, and declaring they will “make a lark of it” by foregoing a house and servants and staying in “the theatrical boarding house of his youth.” A bewildered Mary is distracted by charming fellow boarder, Ed LeMotte, an  inventor who is working on a moving picture machine.

After a disastrous job hunt, Daniel pulls out his recipe for Dr. Dunbar's soap and cooks it up in his room. He is hawking it on a street corner when fellow boarders Evelyn Diamond and her daughter, Francine, see him. He flees and ducks into a nickelodeon, where he tries to sell the soap. A barker drags him to the manager—Doc Selby—who is glad to see him and offers him a job and an advance.

George Burdo exposes Dan's soapmaking to the residents of the boarding house, but Bernice reserves judgment. Dan returns, swears the Diamonds to secrecy, and reveals that he is Richard Mansfield's  understudy in King Lear. As expected, they tell everyone. Dan tells Bernice the soapmaking is a hobby.

Burdo is furious. Mary steps forward to defend her father. With a flourish, Dan produces a $20 bill and hands it to Mary “to relieve their indebtedness.” 

While changing into his Wild Man of Borneo costume, Dan confesses to Doc he is worried about breaking Mary's heart.  

At the boarding house, Mary asks her father to read Lear to her Cordelia. Bernice is moved. Stunned to learn they are all going to the theater, Dan collapses on his way out. The detective Evelyn hired to find her husband arrives and announces success. They all decide to follow him instead. Freed from his need to feign illness, Dan leaves. Everyone else follows the detective—to the Nickelodeon. 

Daniel is unrecognizable in his costume. When Burdo riles the audience by crying “fake”, Doc appears. Bernice identifies him: He owes her $4,000. Doc declares she took him for everything he ever had and appeals to his friend of 20 years, Dan, who reveals himself. Bernice leaves in tears. Dan says meaningfully, “Take care of her,” to Ed, who says he understands and takes Mary home.

Daniel returns to the boardinghouse with an elaborate story. In private, Bernice shows him a portrait of her husband, “a gallant scoundrel, like you, Daniel.” She proposes to him. He tells her he has been “disappearing” ever since he was 14, and is about to do it again. He plans not to see Mary but she and Ed are kissing in a taxi outside. They are engaged, Ed—whose father was a medicine showman— has signed a contract for a motion picture. He wants Dan to be involved. 

Inside, they learn that Doc has remarried Evelyn. He gives Dan a half-interest in the Nickelodeon and suggests they put Ed's “flickers” in. Just as a sideline, since it is a “passing fad.”

Irma brings in a birthday cake for Dan, who embarks on a tall tale about escaping the Little Big Horn.

Cast 
Frank Morgan as J. Daniel "Dan" Thompson
Mary Howard as Mary Thompson
Billie Burke as Bernice Marshall
Donald Meek as Professor Charles W. Birdo
Marjorie Main as Irma
Connie Gilchrist as Mrs. Evelyn Diamond
Bonita Granville as Francine "Frankie" Diamond
Dan Dailey as Ed LeMotte
Andrew Tombes as "Doc" Dunbar
Walter Catlett as "Doc" Skelby
Joseph J. Greene as Mr. Robert Emmett Ferderber
Phil Silvers as Murdock
Matt McHugh as Buggy driver

Reception 
Writing for Turner Classic Movies, Glenn Erickson observed:  “The colorful cast includes a gallery of distinctive personalities: Donald Meek, Marjorie Main, Bonita Granville and Phil Silvers. Did producer Joseph Mankiewicz intend this odd comedy as an 'origin story' for the motion picture business?”

Production 
Principal photography took place from early October to mid-November 1940, with retakes starting on January 2, 1941, photographed by Robert Planck, since Oliver T. Marsh, the film's cinematographer, was shooting another film.

MGM employed Ruby Ray, a bird call imitator, to instruct Donald Meek on how to purse his lips so as to appear to be imitating birds.  She also did the actual whistling heard in the film.

References

External links 
 
 
 

1941 films
American comedy films
1941 comedy films
Metro-Goldwyn-Mayer films
Films produced by Joseph L. Mankiewicz
Films with screenplays by Waldo Salt
Films directed by Robert B. Sinclair
American black-and-white films
Films set in Borneo
1940s English-language films
1940s American films